Xiao Zhao crater is small in comparison with many other craters on Mercury. However, Xiao Zhao's long bright rays make it a readily visible feature. The fresh, bright rays, which were created by material ejected outward during the impact event that formed the crater, indicate that Xiao Zhao is a relatively young crater on Mercury's surface.

Hollows are present within Xiao Zhao and on the ejecta blanket near the rim.

Xiao Zhao was named by the IAU in 2008 after the 12th-century Chinese painter Xiao Zhao.

Xiao Zhao is located near Eastman crater.

Views

References

Impact craters on Mercury